Takahiro Terachi (born 8 July 1979) is a former professional tennis player from Japan.

Tennis career
Born in Tokyo, Terachi began competing professionally in 1998 and reached a career high singles ranking of 219 in the world, winning 17 ITF Futures titles. His best performance on the ATP Tour came at the 2001 Shanghai Open, where he won his way through to the quarter-finals, with wins over Cecil Mamiit and Michael Tebbutt. He made the Japan Open second round twice from six appearances, including 2005 when he defeated Philipp Kohlschreiber.

Terachi appeared for Japan in four Davis Cup ties from 2002 to 2004. He won two of his four doubles rubbers. His only singles rubber was against Febi Widhiyanto and he had to retire in the second set with a wrist injury. 

In addition to the Davis Cup he also represented Japan in the Asian Games and won a doubles bronze in Bangkok in 1998, partnering Michihisa Onoda. He was a gold medalist in the team event at the 2002 Asian Games in Busan, with his upset win over South Korean's Lee Hyung-taik giving Japan an unassailable 2–0 lead in the final.

See also
List of Japan Davis Cup team representatives

References

External links
 
 
 

1979 births
Living people
Japanese male tennis players
Sportspeople from Tokyo
Asian Games medalists in tennis
Tennis players at the 1998 Asian Games
Tennis players at the 2002 Asian Games
Asian Games gold medalists for Japan
Asian Games silver medalists for Japan
Asian Games bronze medalists for Japan
Medalists at the 1998 Asian Games
Medalists at the 2002 Asian Games
20th-century Japanese people
21st-century Japanese people